The Primetime Emmy Award for Outstanding Contemporary Costumes is presented as part of the Primetime Emmy Awards. In 2015, this category and Outstanding Costumes for a Period/Fantasy Series, Limited Series, or Movie were created. They replaced the now retired categories of Outstanding Costumes for a Miniseries, Movie, or Special and Outstanding Costumes for a Series.

Rules require that nominations are distributed proportionally among regular series and limited series/movies, based on the number of submissions of each. For instance, if two-fifths of submissions are limited series/movies then two of the five nominees will be limited series/movies.

Winners and nominations

2010s

2020s

Designers with multiple awards
This total includes nominations for Outstanding Costumes for a Series.

2 awards
 L. Paul Dafelmair 
 Lou Eyrich
 Shelly Levine
 Bob Mackie
 Patrick R. Norris
 Loree Parral 
 Uliva Pizzetti

Programs with multiple awards
This total includes nominations for Outstanding Costumes for a Series.

2 awards
 Fame
 JAG
 Picket Fences
 thirtysomething

Designers with multiple nominations
This total includes nominations for Outstanding Costumes for a Series.

11 nominations
 Shelly Levine
 Loree Parral

6 nominations
 Ret Turner

5 nominations
 Michelle Cole
 Lori DeLapp
 Lou Eyrich
 Bill Hargate
 Allyson B. Fanger
 Patrick R. Norris

4 nominations
 Catherine Adair
 Cliff Chally
 Grady Hunt
 Al Lehman
 Nolan Miller
 Paolo Nieddu
 Devon Patterson 
 Juliet Polcsa
 Robert Turturice
 Joyce Unruh
 Karo Vartanian

3 nominations
 Marisa Aboitiz
 Mark Agnes
 Heidi Bivens
 Molly Harris Campbell
 Shawn Holly Cookson
 Brenda Cooper
 L. Paul Dafelmair
 Terry Gordon
 Anne Hartley
 Bob Mackie
 Bridget Ostersehite
 Lauren Press
 Jennifer Salim
 Marie Schley
 Marti M. Squyres
 Rebecca Weinberg

2 nominations
 Danielle Baker
 Karen Bellamy 
 Steffany Bernstein-Pratt 
 Eduardo Castro
 Michael R. Chapman
 Darci Cheyne 
 Kevin Draves
 Lori Eskowitz
 Elizabeth Feldbauer
 Kathleen Felix-Hager
 Dan Frank
 Alix Friedberg
 Laura Goldsmith
 Kristine Haag
 Artie Hach
 Luellyn Harper
 Debra Hanson
 Leslie Herman
 Daniele Hollywood
 Mary Lane
 Daniel Lawson
 Marilyn Matthews
 Jill Ohanneson
 Heather Pain
 Claire Parkinson
 Lily Parkinson
 Melina Root
 Linda Serijan
 Jerry Skeels
 Wendy Stephanelli
 Rachael Stanley
 Travilla
 Patricia Trujillo
 Angelina Vitto 
 Mary Walbridge
 Kim Wilcox
 Eilish Zebrasky

Programs with multiple nominations
This total includes nominations for Outstanding Costumes for a Series.

6 nominations
 L.A. Law
 The Nanny

5 nominations
 Black-ish
 China Beach
 Empire
 Grace and Frankie
 Murder, She Wrote
 Sex and the City
 thirtysomething

4 nominations
 Designing Women
 Desperate Housewives
 Dynasty
 Picket Fences
 The Sopranos

3 nominations
 Alias
 Euphoria
 JAG
 Mama's Family
 Married... with Children
 Moonlighting
 Murphy Brown
 Ugly Betty
 Pose  
 Six Feet Under
 Transparent

2 nominations
 Ally McBeal
 Cybill
 Dallas
 Fame
 Glee
 The Good Wife
 Hacks
 NewsRadio
 Night Court
 The Politician
 Scarecrow and Mrs. King
 Schitt's Creek
 Will & Grace

Notes

References

Outstanding Contemporary Costumes